PM-International AG is a manufacturer of dietary supplements and cosmetics based in Schengen (Luxembourg).

History 
PM International was founded in 1993 by Rolf Sorg in Limburgerhof. In the same year, the first foreign branch office was opened in Poland. In 1994, the PM International holding company was founded in Schengen, Luxembourg. Since 2015, the company headquarters have been located there.

In 2003, the company opened a logistics center in Speyer (Rhineland-Palatinate). In 2005, the legal form was changed from a GmbH (limited liability company) to an unlisted stock corporation. In 2015, the company opened a headquarters for the Asia-Pacific region in Singapore.

In 2019, construction began on a fourth warehouse in Speyer, Germany. 2020 saw expansion to Arendonk in Belgium. In the same year, the company released its own payment system PM Direct Cash in Europe, with which sales partners receive their income directly at the conclusion of the purchase.

Company structure 
PM International has over 35 branches in more than 40 countries worldwide. In 2019, the company generated total sales of 205 million euros in Germany. PM-International employs over 950 people worldwide, 192 of whom work at the logistics center in Speyer (2020). The company's products are sold through independent distributors in network marketing, on the Internet and through its own direct sales force. 

PM International is run as a family business, father Dieter Sorg is an engineer and responsible for the company's construction projects, wife Vicki Sorg looks after the social projects and Rolf Sorg's mother is also involved in the company. The company also maintains a research cooperation in the field of nutritional sciences with the FH Oberösterreich.

Products 
The company develops and produces exclusively products of its own brand FitLine. PM-International is also the official supplier of various sports teams and associations with its FitLine brand.

Sponsorship 
The company cooperates with sports teams such as the German, Austrian and Polish Ski Associations, the German Ice Hockey Federation, the German Cycling Federation, the German Athletics Association, the Swiss Sliding Federation, the Luxembourg Handball Federation and the Luxembourg Basketball Federation.

Awards 

 2018: German Brand Award of the German Design Council and the German Brand Institute
 2018: Charity Award of the industry magazine Network-Karriere
 2019: German Brand Award of the German Design Council and the German Brand Institute
 2020: German Brand Award of the German Design Council and the German Brand Institute, "Excellent Brands / Health & Pharmaceuticals".
 2010-2022: Represented in the DSN Global 100: The Top Direct Selling Companies in the World list (rank 9 in 2022)
 2021: Le Fonti Award

External links  
 Offizielle Homepage

References 

Cosmetics companies of Luxembourg
Direct sales companies
Luxembourgian companies established in 1993
Rhein-Pfalz-Kreis
Nutritional supplement companies